The DRU Superliga is the highest tier of the national rugby union competition in Denmark.

The Danish First division has 11 clubs in total divided in 2 pools. The clubs that reach the Top 3 from each Division 1 pool (East and West) go through to the Super League.

The punctuation system in the Superliga: 4 Points for a win, 2P for a tie and bonus points are given if 4 tries or more are scored and/or if the loser team has a -7 margin.

Denmark First Div

East

West

2012 Edition
Holstebro RK
Aarhus RK
Erritsø GIF Rugby
Frederiksberg RK
RK Speed
CSR-Nanok

*These are the Top 3 teams of each pool that complete the 2012 DRU Superliga.

Denmark Second Div
The second division is made up with some of the 2nd XV teams of a few of the first division clubs, and others that complete the championship league. Teams such as:
Lindø/Odense - They are an independent club, with their own junior teams, but have been playing in combination with RC Odense at senior level since 2010.
Roskilde Vikings RK
CBS Rugby

References

External links
  - Official DRU Superliga Table
 Denmark Rugby Union - Official DRU Site

See also
Rugby union in Denmark

Rugby union in Denmark
National rugby union premier leagues
Den
rugby union